The 1958 British Grand Prix was a Formula One race held on 19 July 1958 at Silverstone. It was race 7 of 11 in the 1958 World Championship of Drivers and race 6 of 10 in the 1958 International Cup for Formula One Manufacturers.

Entries
Bernie Ecclestone entered a pair of Connaughts for Ivor Bueb and Jack Fairman, with Ecclestone also named as a driver of the Fairman car in case he needed to take over the entry.

Classification

Qualifying

Race

Notes
 – Includes 1 point for fastest lap

Championship standings after the race

Drivers' Championship standings

Constructors' Championship standings

 Notes: Only the top five positions are included for both sets of standings.

References

British Grand Prix
British Grand Prix
British Grand Prix
British Grand Prix